KWST (1430 kHz) is a commercial AM radio station licensed to El Centro, California. It is owned by Entravision Communications and leased to El Sembrador Ministries, broadcasting to the Imperial Valley and Mexicali, Baja California.

KWST is powered with 1,000 watts by day.  But at night, it reduces power to 36 watts.  The transmitter is off Dogwood Road in El Centro.

KWST airs El Sembrador's ESNE Radio Spanish-language network. Programming is also heard on a five-watt FM translator in El Centro, K229CU at 93.7 MHz, which is owned directly by El Sembrador.

History
The station first signed on the air on June 1, 1958, as KAMP. It was originally a daytimer, broadcasting at 1,000 watts but required to sign off at sunset to avoid interfering with other stations on AM 1430.  KAMP was owned by the El Centro Radio Corporation and was one of the leading stations in the Imperial Valley for the next few decades. It carried, at various times, programming from ABC Radio and NBC Radio.  It sometimes aired country music and sometimes it had an oldies format.

The station changed its call sign from KAMP to the current KWST by the Federal Communications Commission on March 15, 2001.

References

External links

WST
WST
Imperial County, California
Yuma County, Arizona
El Centro, California
Yuma, Arizona